Andrés Eloy Blanco is a municipality of Sucre, Venezuela. The capital is Casanay.

Municipalities of Sucre (state)